Diadegma meridionator is a wasp first described by Aubert in 1971. It is a member of the genus Diadegma and family Ichneumonidae. No subspecies are listed.

References 

meridionator

Insects described in 1971